Bermuda first participated at the Olympic Games in 1936, and has sent athletes to compete in every Summer Olympic Games since then, except when they participated in the 1980 Summer Olympics boycott. Bermuda has also participated in every Winter Olympic Games since 1992. 

With Flora Duffy's gold medal in the women's triathlon in 2021, Bermuda is the smallest country in the world by population to have won a gold medal at the Summer Olympics. Since 1976, they had been the smallest country, by population, to win a medal overall, however that record ended when Alessandra Perilli won bronze for San Marino in trap shooting in 2021.

The National Olympic Committee for Bermuda was created in 1935 and recognised by the International Olympic Committee in 1936.

Medal tables

Medals by Summer Games

Medals by Winter Games

Medals by sport

List of medalists

See also
 List of flag bearers for Bermuda at the Olympics
 :Category:Olympic competitors for Bermuda

References

External links
 
 
 
 

 
Olympics